John Kevin McHale (born 1 October 1939) was an English professional footballer who played as a striker for Huddersfield Town, Crewe Alexandra, Chester and Hastings United.

Huddersfield Town Days 
Kevin McHale was one of the most gifted youngsters to play for Huddersfield Town and over eleven seasons he became one of Huddersfield's most consistent and familiar post war players. Despite his inexperience he became one of the steadying figures as Town began adjusting to life in the Second Division during the 1950s and 60s and, after making his debut at just seventeen years old, he was a regular in one of the strongest Town squads of the last fifty years.

Born in 1939, McHale began his career playing for Barnsley and England Schools, before joining First Division Town as a sixteen-year-old in May 1955. The following season was to be Town's last in the top flight for fourteen years. A right-sided player with brilliant distribution and pace, Kevin's signature was much sought after by Town boss Andy Beattie, but the young player delayed signing professional forms until after he gained England Youth honours. He eventually became a full-time professional in October 1956 and made an impressive debut against Leicester City, during which he scored Town's second in a 2–2 draw. It was the start of a long and distinguished career at Leeds Road.

Despite spending his entire Town career in the Second Division, McHale had the privilege of playing alongside some of the club's great names including Vic Metcalfe, Les Massie and Bill McGarry. But there was one player with whom McHale would click more than any other player and with whom he would strike up a devastating partnership – Denis Law.

Law made his debut three months after McHale and the teenagers immediately set about forming one of the most breathtakingly brilliant right-sided partnerships in the club's history. Kevin proved an ideal associate for Law to display his abundant ability and from making their partnership debut away at Notts County on 24 December 1956, the duo were virtually ever present until the end of the season. Leeds Road regulars suspected their budding young professionals were something special, but it was not until the Third Round of the FA Cup in a second replay against Sheffield United that this was confirmed. The two turned in a match winning performance, arguably their best game together, as Town won 2–1 thanks to goals from Quested and Hickson. The game was played at Maine Road and Law's performance had no doubt alerted the eagle-eyed Manchester City scouts. Town progressed to the fifth round of the FA Cup before being knocked out by Burnley.

During a debut season to cherish, McHale made 32 appearances, scoring 3 goals, and his place in the side was secure under new boss Bill Shankly. Over the next three seasons he made a further 96 appearances scoring a further 20 goals. He scored twelve goals during the 1959/60 season, finishing second in the scoring chart behind Les Massie. That was also the season Law left Leeds Road for Manchester City for a record transfer fee.

The following season, despite the loss of Law and the club only just avoiding relegation, McHale continued to flourish. By the time he hit his mid twenties he had already made over 300 appearances for Town and scored over 50 goals. During the early 1960s, manager Eddie Boot came and went as Town pushed for a return to the top flight and when Tom Johnston took the helm in 1965, McHale would enjoy just one more full season. In 1965–66 he was virtually ever present as Town narrowly missed out on promotion, finishing fourth in Division Two. He scored eight goals, but Johnston perceived lack of promotion as a failure and began to restructure the team.

As Johnston attempted to lower the average age of the team, 28-year-old McHale was sidelined and from August 1966 to January 1968 he made just 12 appearances. He was soon transferred to Crewe Alexandra.

McHale is one of the most enduring figures of Town's history and to those who saw him play, one of the most endearing. Supporters' affinity with McHale was not just down to his consistency or his awe-inspiring relationship with Law; they had seen the youngster grow and develop and so he became a true favourite.

After Huddersfield 
McHale arrived at Crewe Alexandra in January 1968 and four months later he had helped guide the Railwaymen to promotion from Division Four, which was followed by relegation in 1968–69. He remained at Gresty Road until October 1970, when he moved to Cheshire rivals Chester for £5,000. He made his debut in a 4–2 win against Bournemouth & Boscombe Athletic and was an ever-present for the remainder of the season as Chester just missed out on promotion. He remained with the club the following season and took his tally to four goals in 64 league appearances for Chester before moving to non-league side Hastings United in the summer of 1972.

References 
 The Fans Favourites – Centenary Huddersfield Town 1908 – 2008 By Alisdair Straughan.
 

1939 births
Living people
Association football forwards
English Football League players
Crewe Alexandra F.C. players
Chester City F.C. players
Hastings United F.C. (1948) players
Footballers from South Yorkshire
English footballers
Huddersfield Town A.F.C. players
People from Mexborough
Footballers from Yorkshire